Zulqarnain Haider is a Pakistani comedian actor, TV drama writer, and stage artist. He is known for the dramas like, "Koshish", "Chhayon", "Help Me Durdana", Qismat Ka Likha, and others.

Career
Zulqarnain's artistic career started in late 1970s. He shared stage with comedians like Umer Sharif. In his fifty years long career, he scripted a number of plays and directed several popular TV dramas. He got his main breakthrough from his own written TV play, "Koshish" in mid 1980s. Then in the PTV drama "Chhayon" (1988), his pet dialogue, "Alkamoonia mein to aisa nahein hota", became very popular.

Dramas and films
 Help Me Durdana, ARY Digital, 2019
 Qismat Ka Likha, Express TV, September 12, 2019
 Jaltay Khwab, Express TV, November 5, 2018
 Romeo Weds Heer, GEO TV, October 21, 2018
 Khatti Meethi Love Story, Express TV, May 17, 2018
 Baydardi, ARY Digital, March 26, 2018
 Laal Ishq, APlus TV, October 14, 2017
 Baby, Express TV, February 27, 2017
 Jaan Nisar, APlus TV, October 21, 2016
 Funkari, TV One, August 15, 2016
 Do Saal Ki Aurat, HUM TV, October 1, 2014
 Dehleez, ARY Digital, February 25, 2013
 Meri Wife Kay Liye, TV One, September 21, 2011
 Chhayon, PTV, 1988
 Koshish, PTV, 1984

Awards and recognition

References

Pakistani male comedians
Pakistani dramatists and playwrights
Pakistani male stage actors
Pakistani male television actors
Pakistani stand-up comedians
Year of birth missing (living people)
Living people